Kučaj is a mountain range in eastern Serbia. Its highest peak, Velika Tresta has an elevation of 1,284 meters above sea level. They belong to the Serbian extension of Carpathians, which separate the valleys of Great Morava and Timok.

Geography 

The area is a plateau in form, of complex tectonic and morphological structure, subdivided by the river valleys. One of the main features is the Resava Cave. North of Resava Cave is the natural monument Lisine, which comprises two waterfalls, Veliko Vrelo and Veliki Buk. The Lisine hydro-complex and Resava Cave are under one administration. In 2017 the Government of Serbia and Institute for Nature Protection began preliminary actions into creating a new national park, which would cover the mountainous Kučaj-Beljanica region. It is supposed to be the sixth and the largest national park in Serbia encompassing the Resava Cave, Lisine complex and some of the oldest, intact forest in the country, like the Vinatovača rainforest, which remained intact since the mid 17th century.

The study on protection was finished in 2020. It concluded that the area is the most forested one in Serbia, and described it as the proper wilderness.

Features

Sinking rivers 

The karst region is location of numerous sinking rivers:

Veliki Buk Watefall 

Veliki Buk (or Lisine) waterfall is located in the watershed of the Resava River in east Serbia. It is carved in the karst area, where the sinking river of Resava springs again from the ground in the canyon-type valley of Sklop. The waters springs from the karst spring Veliko Vrelo, forming a short stream of the same name which falls into the Resava. In August 2017 the waterfall was embellished with the color-changing decorative lights, becoming the first hydrology object in Serbia with such lights. The access roads are arranged with several restaurants but as of 2017 there is no mobile phone signal in the area, which the local tourist guides say is "probably a positive thing". There is also an stream water mill, "Mija's watermill" within the complex. It is built in 1918 and is still operational, though it is adapted into the tourist attraction, equipped with the objects from the century ago.

References

External links 

Mountains of Serbia
Serbian Carpathians